McKirahan is a surname. Notable people with this surname include:

 Andrew McKirahan (born 1990), American former professional baseball pitcher
 Richard McKirahan, American philosopher and professor